Calathus pecoudi is a species of ground beetle from the Platyninae subfamily that is endemic to Madeira.

References

pecoudi
Beetles described in 1938
Endemic fauna of Madeira
Beetles of Europe